The Giro del Capo was a road cycling stage race held in the vicinity of Cape Town, South Africa. The 2009 edition was held in the form of four challenges. The last edition, held in 2010, was ranked as 2.2 by the UCI and was part of the UCI Africa Tour.

Winners

References

External links
 Official site

UCI Africa Tour races
Cycle races in South Africa
Recurring sporting events established in 1992
1992 establishments in South Africa
2010 disestablishments in South Africa
Recurring sporting events disestablished in 2010
Defunct sports competitions in South Africa
Autumn events in South Africa
Defunct cycling races in South Africa